Backyard Babies are a punk rock band from Nässjö, Sweden.

Backyard Babies may also refer to:
Backyard Babies (1990 album)
Backyard Babies (2008 album)